Fredric Drum is a fictional character who appears in works by the Norwegian author Gert Nygårdshaug, the protagonist of ten crime fiction novels published over the course of 21 years. Outside Norway the Fredric Drum series has been published in Denmark, Germany, Poland and Russia.

Character

The character Fredric Drum is a gourmet master chef, a connoisseur of fine wine, the proprietor of a small Michelin-starred restaurant in Oslo named Kasserollen, a cryptographer, and an amateur detective with a strong sense of curiosity. His adventures frequently take place in exotic locations such as France, Østerdalen, Italy, Egypt, Mexico and New Guinea, and with considerable focus on various ancient cultures, such as the Minoan civilisation or Ancient Egypt, whose myths and archaeological mysteries Drum are frequently drawn to.

Drum's uncle, Skarphedin Olsen, is a police investigator with the National Criminal Investigation Service.

Response
The series has been called among Norwegian crime literature's most playful and original. Critics have claimed to identify references in the series to works by other authors such as Knut Hamsun and Umberto Eco.

With a stated target of completing ten books of the series, Nygårdshaug published the final Fredric Drum novel in 2006, and it was consensus among critics that the series maintained the same level of quality to the very end.

Though Nygårdshaug has worked within a wide range of genres throughout his career including poetry and children's literature, and won a people's award for "Best Norwegian Book of All Time" with Mengele Zoo, he is arguably best known for his Fredric Drum series.

In the wake of the series' success, there has been arranged theme tours with Nygårdshaug, "in the footsteps of Fredric Drum", to Saint-Émilion.

Series bibliography
 Honningkrukken (1985, The Honey Jar)
 Jegerdukken (1987, The Hunter's Puppet)
 Dødens codex (1990, The Codex of Death)
 Det niende prinsipp (1992, The Ninth Principle)
 Cassandras finger (1993, Finger of Cassandra)
 Kiste nummer fem (1996, Coffin Number Five)
 Den balsamerte ulven (2000, The Embalmed Wolf)
 Liljer fra Jerusalem (2001, Lilies from Jerusalem)
 Alle orkaners mor (2004, The Mother of All Hurricanes) 
 Rødsonen (2006, The Red Zone)

References

 Gert Nygårdshaug dossier Cappelen Damm

Footnotes

External links
 Fredric Drum short stories Red & White 

Literary characters introduced in 1985
Characters in novels of the 20th century
Characters in novels of the 21st century
Fictional archaeologists
Fictional chefs
Fredric Drum